Dogway is an unincorporated community in Webster County, West Virginia, United States.

The community takes its name from Dogway Fork creek.

References 

Unincorporated communities in West Virginia
Unincorporated communities in Webster County, West Virginia